"Arroyito" is a Latin pop song by Colombian recording artist Fonseca. It was written and produced by Wilfran Castillo, for his third studio album. The song was released digitally on May 5, 2008, for the album Gratitud.
In 2012 the Austrian singer Hansi Hinterseer covered the song titled "So Sehr Liebe Ich Dich" (So Much I love You).

Track listing

Charts

References

2008 singles
Spanish-language songs
Arroyito
2008 songs
EMI Latin singles